Cannabis in Wisconsin is illegal for recreational use. Possession of any amount is punishable by up to 6 months in prison and a $1000 fine for a first offense. A second offense is punished as a felony with up to 3.5 years in prison and up to a $10,000 fine. At the local level however, numerous municipalities and counties have decriminalized cannabis or lessened penalties for minor possession offenses. Medical use is legal only in the form of low-THC cannabis oil (CBD oil).

Wisconsin was the nation's leading hemp producer during the 1940s and home to the nation's last hemp-producing company (Rens Hemp Company) prior to federal prohibition. A 2017 law reauthorized hemp cultivation in the state.

Industrial hemp
Industrial hemp was grown experimentally in Wisconsin as early as 1908 on state farms under the direction of the Wisconsin Agricultural Experiment Station. By 1917 there were 7,000 acres dedicated to hemp farming in the state, and by the 1940s Wisconsin led the nation in industrial hemp production.

The Rens Hemp Company of Brandon, Wisconsin, closed in 1958, was the last legal hemp producer in the U.S. following World War II. Prior to its 1958 shutdown, Rens had been the primary provider of hemp rope for the United States Navy.

In November 2017, Governor Scott Walker signed a law legalizing the cultivation of industrial hemp (containing under 0.3% THC), following unanimous passage of the bill in the Wisconsin legislature.

Prohibition
The 1939 legislation "161.275 Possession and use of marijuana; penalty" stated that the penalty for "growing, cultivating, mixing, compounding, having control of, preparing, possessing, using, prescribing, selling, administering or dispensing marijuana or hemp" would be no less than one year and no more than two years in the state prison. Currently, possession of any amount (first offense) is a misdemeanor, punishable by up to 6 months in prison and a $1,000 fine. Possession of any amount for a subsequent offense is a felony, punishable by up to 3.5 years in prison and a $10,000 fine, which is also the penalty for selling 200 grams or less.

State law allows possession of less than 25 grams to be prosecuted as an ordinance violation at the municipal and county level, permitting those entities to issue a penalty of monetary forfeiture (fines) with no jail time if the amount specified by the ordinance is received. In pratice, numerous counties and municipalities have such ordinances.

Reforms

State level

CBD oil legalization (2014, 2017)
In April 2014, Wisconsin Act 267 (2013 Assembly Bill 726) was enacted. The legislation nominally legalized the use of cannabidiol (CBD) in the state for treatment of seizure disorders. It was passed by a voice vote in the Assembly and a unanimous 33–0 vote in the Senate. It was renamed "Lydia's Law" by an act a month later in honor of a seven-year-old girl who suffered from a rare form of epilepsy; the girl's parents had pushed for CBD legislation in the state. The bill was criticized as being largely symbolic, as in order to gain support for passage in the Senate, its sponsors added a clause specifying that CBD oil must have FDA approval to be prescribed; prior to that clause the bill had support in the Assembly but was stalled in the Senate. Because CBD did not yet have FDA approval, and because a complex series of steps were required to allow trial usage, Wisconsin doctors were not allowed to prescribe CBD. As a result, CBD advocates stated that they could not find a doctor in Wisconsin willing to prescribe CBD. In mid-2015, state Sen. Van Wanggaard proposed an amendment to remove penalties for possession of CBD oil, negating prescription requirements, but the amendment still would not provide a legal way to create or obtain CBD oil.

In 2017, Governor Scott Walker signed into law a bill that amended Lydia's Law to legalize access to CBD oil for people whose doctors certify that the oil is used to treat a medical condition. Prior to that, access to CBD oil had been limited in Wisconsin. With the exception of one state senator, every other legislator in the Senate and Assembly voted for the bill.

Other reforms proposed
In 2013 and 2015 state Representative Melissa Sargent (D-Madison) introduced bills to fully legalize cannabis in the state, with no success. In 2017 another such bill was introduced.

In February 2019, newly-elected governor Tony Evers announced that his upcoming budget would include a proposal to legalize the use of cannabis for medical purposes, decriminalize for any use possession of up to 25 grams, and establish an expungement procedure for convictions involving less than 25 grams.  Evers has also previously spoken in support of legalizing the recreational use of cannabis, though this was not included in the proposal.

Lower-level jurisdictions

Madison decriminalization (1977)
For possession in public, offenders would be subject to a $109 fine unless used under the care of a doctor. The law was one of the earliest municipal decriminalization ordinances passed in the nation.

Milwaukee (1997)
In May 1997, Milwaukee Mayor John Norquist signed a bill to make the first-time possession of up to 25 grams of cannabis a non-criminal offense, punishable by a fine ranging from $250 to $500 or imprisonment of up to 20 days.  The legislation also allowed offenders the option to perform community service or take drug education classes.  In 2015 the penalty for possession of up to 25 grams was further reduced to a $50 fine.

Dane County (2014)
On April 1, 2014, residents of Dane County voted on a non-binding referendum to indicate whether or not state lawmakers should pass legislation to allow the recreational use of cannabis.  The measure passed with 64.5% of the vote.

Menominee Indian Reservation (2015)

In August 2015, members of the Menominee Indian Reservation (conterminous with Menominee County) voted 677 to 499 to legalize cannabis for recreational use and 899 to 275 to legalize cannabis for medical use. The Menonimee are uniquely positioned in the state, as the only Indian reservation that falls solely under the jurisdiction of federal law (rather than under Wisconsin Public Law 280 like all other reservations in the state), meaning that the state of Wisconsin cannot prevent legal changes within the sovereign reservation.

2018 advisory referendums
In November 2018, voters in eleven Wisconsin counties approved non-binding referendums expressing support for legalizing medical cannabis, and voters in six counties approved non-binding referendums expressing support for legalizing recreational cannabis.  The support for medical cannabis ranged from 67.1% in Clark County to 88.5% in Kenosha County, while support for recreational cannabis ranged from 60.2% in Racine county to 76.4% in Dane County.  The 16 counties that weighed in accounted for over half the state's population.

Eau Claire (2018)
In November 2018, Eau Claire city council members approved a resolution setting a $1 fine for first-time possession of up to 25 grams of cannabis (though with court costs included the total comes to $138).  The resolution came a few weeks after voters in Eau Claire County approved a non-binding referendum expressing support for legalizing the recreational use of cannabis.

Madison decriminalization (2020)
In November 2020, Madison Common Council approved legislation to allow individuals 18 and older to possess up to 28 grams of cannabis and consume it in public and private places. Use within 1000 feet of a school, where tobacco smoking is prohibited, or without the consent of the property owner remain illegal under the law (reduced to a $1 fine). The ordinance passed with only one opposing vote.

Milwaukee County (2021)
In March 2021, the Milwaukee County Board of Supervisors voted 16–1 to reduce the penalty for possession of up to 25 grams of cannabis to $1 (not including court costs). Previously the fine was $275.

Oshkosh (2021)
In September 2021, the Oshkosh City Council voted 6-1 to lower the municipal fine for first offense possession of cannabis from $200 to $75.

Green Bay (2022)
In March 2022, Green Bay City Council voted unanimously to eliminate the fine for possessing up to 28 grams of cannabis so that only court costs would apply ($61). The fine for possession of paraphernalia was also similarly eliminated.

2022 advisory referendums
In November 2022, voters in three counties and five municipalities approved non-binding referendums expressing support for the legalization of recreational cannabis. The measures were approved in the counties of Dane, Eau Claire, and Milwaukee, and the municipalities of Appleton, Kenosha, Racine, Stevens Point, and Superior. Support ranged from 69% in Eau Claire County to 82% in Dane County.

See also
 Legality of cannabis by U.S. jurisdiction
 Wisconsin NORML

References